Chortoq ( — 4 hills) is a city in Namangan Region, Uzbekistan. It is the administrative center of Chortoq District.

Etymology 
The name "Chortoq" means "4 hills" (from the Persian "chor" - 4 and the Turkic "togh, toq" - hill, mountain), which indicates 4 artificially created hills (hills) in the city, which served at one time for military-defensive and warning purposes.

Geography 
Located in northern part of the Ferghana Valley (Fargʻona vodiysi) in eastern Uzbekistan.

Population 
Its population is 53,400 (2016).

References

Populated places in Namangan Region
Cities in Uzbekistan